Señorita República Dominicana Mundo 1966 was held on September 30, 1966. There were 26 candidates who competed for the national crown. The winner represented the Dominican Republic at Miss World 1966. The top 10 showed their evening gowns and answered questions to advance to the top 5, where they answered more questions.

Results
 Señorita República Dominicana Mundo 1966: Jeanette Dotel Montes de Ocoa (San Juan de la Maguana)
 1st Runner-up: Eva Ferro (La Altagracia)
 2nd Runner-up: Clarisa Germán (Nueva Era)
 3rd Runner-up: Ana Ortíz (Puerto Plata)
 4th Runner-up: Corina Tejeda (Azua)

Top 10
 Sarah Xavier (Ciudad Santo Domingo)
 Margarita Rueckschnat (Distrito Nacional)
 Tatiana de Las Palmas (Santiago)
 Ynes Vargas (San Pedro de Macorís)
 Cristiana Hidalgo (San Cristóbal)

Special awards
 Miss Rostro Bello – Eva Ferro (La Altagracia)
 Miss Photogenic (voted by press reporters) – Isaura Ynoa (Dajabón)
 Miss Congeniality (voted by contestants) – Lisa de Abreu (Sánchez Ramírez)

Delegates

 Azua - Corina Magdalena Tejeda Sosa
 Baoruco - Claudia Jenifer Henríquez Sandro
 Barahona - Fatima Rojas de la Cruz
 Ciudad Santo Domingo - Sarah Desiree Xavier Tobias
 Dajabón - Isaura Rita Ynoa Frutos
 Distrito Nacional - Margarita Rosa Rueckschnat Schott
 Duarte - Sofia Camren Guerrero Gordon
 Espaillat - Isabela del Carmen Molina Peralta
 La Altagracia - Eva María Ferro Rodríguez
 La Vega - Ana Andreina Tatis Rodríguez
 Monte Cristi - María Altagracia Reynosa Solano
 Nueva Era - Clarisa Laura Germán Peralta
 Pedernales - Sandra María Espinoza Cardona
 Peravia - Marisol del Carmen Reyes Tosado
 Puerto Plata - Ana María Ortíz Mendoza
 Salcedo - María Caridad Espinal Espinal
 Samaná - Yurissa Marleny Goico Ramírez
 Sánchez Ramírez - Ana Elisa de Abreu Tavarez
 San Cristóbal - Cristiana Reina Hidalgo Zamora
 San Juan de la Maguana - Jeanette Dotel Montes de Ocoa
 San Pedro de Macorís - Ynes Daina Vargas Garoid
 San Rafael - Soraya Agnes Rosario Vargas
 Santiago - Tatiana de Las Palmas Cruz
 Santiago Rodríguez - Catalina Orutea Somaro Zaragoza
 Seibo - Lynedis Fernanda Hernández de la Rosa
 Valverde - Denise Cristina de Moya García

Trivia
 Miss Nueva Era and Miss San Pedro de Macorís entered Miss Dominican Republic 1962.
 Miss La Altagracia entered Miss Dominican Republic 1964.
 Miss San Juan de la Maguana entered Miss Dominican Republic 1965.
 Miss Distrito Nacional entered and won Miss World at Miss Dominican Republic 1967.
 Miss Puerto Plata entered and won Miss Dominican Republic 1968.

References

Miss Dominican Republic
1966 beauty pageants
1966 in the Dominican Republic